The Pakistani textbooks controversy refers to claimed inaccuracies and historical denialism. The inaccuracies and myths promote religious intolerance and Indophobia and lead to calls for curriculum reform. According to the Sustainable Development Policy Institute, Pakistan's school textbooks have systematically inculcated anti-Indian discrimination through historical omissions and deliberate misinformation since the 1970s.

The revisionism can be traced back to the rule of General Muhammad Zia-ul-Haq, who instituted a program of Islamization of the country. His 1979 education policy stated that the highest priority would be given to the revision of the curricula with a view of reorganizing the entire content around Islamic thought and giving education an ideological orientation so that Islamic ideology permeates the thinking of the younger generation to help them with the necessary conviction and ability to transform society according to Islamic tenets. In March 2016, Senate Chairman Raza Rabbani from the upper house of the Pakistani Parliament addressed that since then, Pakistani textbooks have taught children more about the benefits of dictatorship than a democracy.

According to Dr. Naazir Mahmood, textbooks on journalism in Pakistan fail to cover the subjects of critical thinking, knowledge development, freedom of speech, gender studies, minority rights, human rights, developmental studies, democracy and constitutionalism. He suggests that instead of engaging in critical inquiry, Pakistani journalists end up parroting jingoistic, insular and narrow-minded narratives. Such journalists end up condoning or even promoting hate speech and sectarian violence toward religious minorities in Pakistan.

Context 
In the first decade after Pakistan gained independence following the partition of India, Pakistan "considered its history to be a part of larger India, a common history, a joint history, and in fact Indian textbooks were in use in the syllabus in Pakistan." The government under Ayub Khan, however, wished to rewrite the history of Pakistan to exclude any reference to India and tasked the historians within Pakistan with manufacturing a nationalist narrative of a "separate" history that erased the Indian past. According to Hussain Haqqani, only officially published textbooks have been used in Pakistani schools and colleges since the era of Ayub Khan. These textbooks are used by the Pakistani government to create a standard narrative of Pakistan's history. Elizabeth A. Cole of the George Mason University School for Conflict Analysis and Resolution noted that Pakistani textbooks eliminate the country's Hindu and Buddhist past while referring to Muslims as a monolithic entity and focusing solely on the advent of Islam in the Indian subcontinent. During the rule of General Muhammad Zia-ul-Haq, a "program of Islamization" of the country including the textbooks started. General Zia's 1979 education policy stated that "the highest priority would be given to the revision of the curricula with a view to reorganizing the entire content around Islamic thought and giving education an ideological orientation so that Islamic ideology permeates the thinking of the younger generation and helps them with the necessary conviction and ability to refashion society according to Islamic tenets". Recently, the contributions of Nehru, Gandhi, Ambedkar, Patel and Bose to the Indian independence movement have been omitted from Pakistani textbooks.

According to the Sustainable Development Policy Institute, since the 1970s Pakistan's school textbooks have systematically inculcated prejudice towards India and Hindus through historical revisionism.

Undermining of democratic values and constitutionalism 
In March 2016, Senate Chairman Raza Rabbani from the upper house of the Pakistani Parliament acknowledged that in the curriculum that was created under Zia's ruling, Pakistani textbooks still teach children about twelve benefits of dictatorship compared with just eight benefits of democracy.

Textbooks of religious education 
In Pakistan, since the 1980s Islamiyat (Islam) is a compulsory subject at every educational level. Since 2018 Punjab province of Pakistan provided for Nazrah Quran (recitation of the Arabic text) to be taught from class I to V and reading translation of the Quran for classes VI-XII has been made mandatory, as per the Punjab Compulsory Teaching of the Holy Quran Act 2018.

In Punjab, a board representing the Islamic clergy known as the Muttahida Ulema Board already had the right to censor educational content; a Curriculum and Textbook Board (Amendment) Bill passed unanimously in 2020 which gave them additional rights to pre-screen any Islamic-related content in all Pakistani textbooks including those of Islamiat, Pakistan Studies, History, and Urdu Literature. In June 2020, another Governor's decree made passing of Quranic examination mandatory before receiving any University degree. According to Baela Raza Jamil, June 2020 legislative changes in Punjab Pakistan would compromise education based on freedom of inquiry and critical thinking in Pakistan. Huma Yusuf expressed surprise over misplaced priorities in Pakistani education wherein right-wing-washing of educational content is being prioritized over education in science, technology, engineering, mathematics and critical thinking.

A voluntary body of educators, Working Group on Inclusive Education (WGIE), expressed its serious reservations about legislative measures in Punjab Pakistan compromising diversity and religious freedom.

According to a study by Muhammad Azeem Ashraf at Hunan University in Changsha, most teaching faculty in Pakistan believe that since Pakistan is an Islamic country, Islam has to be associated with nationalism. As such, Islam can only be introduced through religious education, which practically includes only Sunni Islam, and leads to the exclusion of minority religious thought from education, Pakistani citizenship, and human rights.

Textbooks of journalism in Pakistan 
According to Dr Naazir Mahmood, textbooks on journalism in Pakistan fail to cover critical thinking, knowledge development, freedom of speech, gender studies, minority rights, human rights, democracy, and constitutionalism, as well as health education and other developmental studies. Mahmood says that, as a result, Pakistani journalists promote rather than question jingoistic, insular, narrow minded narratives, condoning and even promoting hate speech and sectarianism against religious minorities in Pakistan.

Criticism 
In a 1995 paper published in the International Journal of Middle East Studies, that focused on a newly invented subject of 'Pakistan studies', historian Ayesha Jalal notes a large extent of creative imagination in the creation of the state historiography, to carve out a national past based on hegemonic values. She remarked on Pakistan's history textbooks as being an example of the relationship between power and bigotry, in regards to the rigid state-controlled education system and curriculum which promoted revisionist history to satisfy its national ideology.

Authors vary widely in establishing the history of the Pakistani nation-state. Jalal deems this an example of narrative confusion resulting from tensions between the ideology of Muslim nationalism and the geographical limitations of the Pakistani nation-state. While some pan-Islamic ideologists locate the time-frame to correspond with the birth of Islam on the Arabian Peninsula and choose to ignore the spatial and temporal distance between the two non-concerted happenings, others opt for a sub-continental approach. An Introduction to Pakistan Studies, (a popular text-book which is compulsory reading for first and second year college students studying for an F.A degree in history), claims that Pakistan is an Islamic State which is governed by Allah and is not a mere geographical entity but an ideology reflecting a unique civilization and culture that was borne of an effort to resist the imposition of Hindu Nationalism on Muslim masses and ward the unethical practices of Hinduism. Another textbook – A Text Book of Pakistan Studies claims that Pakistan "came to be established for the first time when the Arabs under Muhammad bin Qasim occupied Sindh and Multan'" and thereafter equates the Indian Subcontinent with Pakistan, whose greatest ruler is subsequently deemed to be Aurangzeb. Anti-Indian sentiments, coupled with anti-Hindu prejudices compound these issues. K. Ali's two volume history designed for B.A. students, even whilst tracing the pre-history of the 'Indo-Pakistan' subcontinent to the Paleolithic and discussing the Dravidian peopless and the Aryans, consistently refers to the post-1947 frontiers of Pakistan. At the end, he supports the existence of the nation-state, based on a religious ideology, in light of a need to immunize themselves from (alleged) Hindu hostility displayed to the Muslims during the independence movement, and the fact that the subcontinent was ruled by Muslims for centuries. 

Scholars like Jameel Jalibi question the validity of any national history that mentions Pakistan's "pre-Islamic past". Jalal notes Ali's assertions to establish reactive religious bigotry as a basis of Pakistan's statehood. Secularism, Communism et al. are painted as evil threats to the state and Jalal notes a textbook wherein Zulfikar Ali Bhutto was described as a drunkard, characterless, and an un-Islami-minded man, courtesy of his sociopolitical leanings towards communism but Zia ul Hak and his dictatorial martial regime is extensively praised for his abidance by Islamic ideologies. In light of the Balochs, Sindhis et al. being increasingly vocal about their regional culture, one textbook identifies regionalism as a "very dangerous episode". It goes on to mention that efforts to advance 'regional dialects and lores' was an attack on the very foundations of the state and that Punjabism shall never be allowed to replace the Islamic culture, because its patron figures had waged wars against Islamic rulers. Textbooks frequently denote Urdu to be superior to regional dialects; a flag-bearer of collective Islamic identity.

All these narratives, though offering arguments of varying dimensions and scope, ultimately support the national policy for the Islamization of the state and the principle of the two-nation theory, wherein the trifecta of Muslims, Islam and Pakistan cannot be challenged. Jalal accuses them of discarding Jinnah's calls for secularism, the opposition of numerous Muslims to the partition and subjugation of regional communities per their own convenience. She notes a broader purpose in educating the future generations to reject anything in their regional cultures that fails to qualify as 'Islamic' and strive for a spiritual and cultural hegemony, in the name of Islam. Anti-Indian sentiments, coupled with anti-Hindu prejudices compound these issues.

According to Tufts University professor Seyyed Vali Reza Nasr, Indophobia in Pakistan increased with the ascendancy of the militant Islamist Jamaat-e-Islami under Sayyid Abul Ala Maududi. Indophobia, together with Anti-Hinduism and racist ideologies, such as the martial race theory, were the driving factors behind the re-writing of school textbooks in Pakistan (in both "secular" schools and Islamic madrassahs) in order to promote a biased and revisionist historiography of the Indian subcontinent that promulgated Indophobic and anti-Hindu prejudices. These narratives are combined with Islamist propaganda in the extensive revising of Pakistan's history. By propagating concepts such as jihad, the inferiority of non-Muslims, India's perceived ingrained enmity with Pakistan, etc., the textbook board publications used by all government schools promote an obscurantist mindset.

According to the historian Professor Mubarak Ali, textbook "reform" in Pakistan began with the introduction of Pakistan Studies and Islamic studies by Zulfiqar Ali Bhutto in 1971 into the national curriculum as a compulsory subject. Former military dictator Muhammad Zia-ul-Haq, under a general drive towards Islamization, started the process of historical revisionism in earnest and exploited this initiative. 'The Pakistani establishment taught their children right from the beginning that this state was built on the basis of religion – that's why they don't have tolerance for other religions and want to wipe-out all of them.'

According to Pakistani physicist, Pervez Hoodbhoy, the Islamist revisionism of Pakistan's schools began in 1976 when an act of parliament required all government and private schools (except those teaching the British O-levels from Grade 9) to follow a curriculum that includes learning outcomes for the federally approved Grade 5 social studies class such as: 'Acknowledge and identify forces that may be working against Pakistan,' 'Make speeches on Jihad,' 'Collect pictures of policemen, soldiers, and national guards,' and 'India's evil designs against Pakistan.'. Likewise, Yvette Rosser criticizes Pakistani textbooks for propagating jingoist and irredentist beliefs about Pakistan's history and culture, and being negationist in its depiction of political Islam and the treatment of minorities in Pakistan, such as Hindus and Christians. Irredentism is manifested through claims of "eternal Pakistan" (despite the country being created from British India only in 1947), narrow and sectarian interpretation of Islam, downplaying the tolerant aspects of the religion and focusing on Islamic Fundamentalist interpretations (such as all banking being un-Islamic), and making accusations of dual loyalty on minority Hindus and Christians in Pakistan.

According to Pakistani professor Tariq Rahman, Pakistani textbooks cannot mention Hindus without calling them cunning, scheming, deceptive, or something equally insulting. The textbooks ignore the pre-Islamic history of Pakistan except to put the Hindu predecessors in  a negative light.

Another Pakistani historian Khursheed Kamal Aziz similarly has criticised Pakistani history textbooks. He stated that textbooks were full of historical errors and suggested that mandatory study amounted to teaching "prescribed myths". After examining 66 textbooks used at various levels of study Aziz argued that the textbooks supported military rule in Pakistan, promoted hatred for Hindus, glorified wars, and distorted the pre-1947 history of Pakistan.

A study by Iftikhar Ahmad of Long Island University published in Current Issues in Comparative Education in 2004 drew five conclusions from content analysis of the social studies textbooks in Pakistan.
 First, the selection of material and their thematic sequence in the textbooks present Islam not simply as a belief system but a political ideology and a grand unifying worldview that must be accepted by all citizens.
 Second, to sanctify Islamic ideology as an article of faith, the textbooks distort historical facts about the nation's cultural and political heritage.
Third, the main objective of the social studies textbooks on Pakistan studies, civics, and global studies, is to indoctrinate children for a romanticised Islamic state as conceptualized by Islamic theocrats.
Fourth, although the vocabulary in the textbooks underscores Islamic virtues, such as piety, obedience, and submission, little is mentioned about critical thinking, civic participation, or democratic values of freedom of speech, equality, and respect for cultural diversity.

A study by Nayyar and Salim of the Sustainable Development Policy Institute concluded in 2003 that there is an increasing trend where children are taught Pakistan Studies as a replacement for the teaching of history and geography as full-fledged disciplines. Previously, children were taught the very early pre-Islamic history of South Asia and its contribution to the rich cultural diversity of modern-day Pakistan. This long historical perspective of Pakistan is absent in the Pakistan Studies textbooks. Instead, children are now taught that the history of Pakistan starts from the day the first Muslim set foot in India. The study reported that the textbooks also had a lot of gender-biased stereotypes and other perspectives that "encourage prejudice, bigotry, and discrimination towards fellow Pakistanis and other nations, especially against religious minorities, as well as the omission of concepts ... that could encourage critical self-awareness among students".

Rubina Saigol, a US educated expert, said, "I have been arguing for the longest time that, in fact, our state system is the biggest Madrassah, we keep blaming madrassahs for everything and, of course, they are doing a lot of things I would disagree with. But the state ideologies of hate and a violent, negative nationalism are getting out there where madrassahs cannot hope to reach."

Referring to NCERT's extensive review of textbooks in India in 2004, Verghese considered the erosion of plural and democratic values in textbooks in India, and the distortion of history in Pakistan to imply the need for coordination between Bangladeshi, Indian, and Pakistani historians to produce a composite history of the subcontinent as a common South Asian reader.

However, international scholars also warn that any attempt at education reform under international pressure or market demands should not overlook the specific expectations of the people at local levels.

Bangladesh and Balochistan narratives 
According to Ali Riaz, South Asian nations curtail academic freedom of expression to secure their respective national identities. Pakistani school curricula hide its history of Bangladesh separation with conspiracy theories and hide the genocide committed by Pakistan's armed forces in Bangladesh. Ali Riaz says curricula about Kashmir and Balochistan provide only a single-sided version.

Examples 
The following excerpts showcase the discriminatory and agitative nature of Pakistani school textbooks:
 The Class III (ages 7–8) book (Punjab Textbook Board) on Urdu teaches that Islam is superior to all other religions.
 The Class VII (ages 11–12) book (Sindh Textbook Board) on Islamic Studies reads: "Most of the [other] religions of the world claim equality, but they never act on it."
 The Class VIII (ages 12–13) book (Punjab Textbook Board) on Islamic Studies reads: "Honesty for non-Muslims is merely a business strategy, while for Muslims it is a matter of faith."
 The Class V (ages 9–10) book (Punjab Board) on Social Studies says: "Religion plays a very important role in promoting national harmony. If the entire population believes in one religion, then it encourages nationalism and promotes national harmony."
 The Class VI book (Punjab Board) on Islamic Studies says: "Though being a student, you cannot practically participate in jihad, but you may provide financial support for jihad."
 The Class IV (ages 8–9) book (Punjab Board) on Urdu says: "The better a Muslim we become, the better a citizen we prove to be."

Controversies about Sectarianism

Sindh 
In spite of a double expert review, one Grade VII book of Social Studies in Sindh came under criticism from MQM since Pro-Pakistan emigrants who came from Bangladesh were being termed as escapees rather than Pakistanis in the textbook. The Sindh provincial Government agreed to remove the controversial content in the next editions.

Punjab 
A matter of sociology books of grade 12th in Punjab province describing Baloch people as "uncivilised people engaged in murder and looting" was criticised in the Pakistani Parliament's upper house in 2016.

Closure of Iranian schools in Balochistan 
In June 2021, the Pakistani government closed down 8 Iranian schools in Quetta despite having a 30-year old Memorandum of Understanding, allegedly for teaching an unauthorized foreign curriculum in the Persian language.

Textbook Board administrative controversies 
In 2018 one of the Sindh Textbook Board's chairmen came under judicial scrutiny for financial mismanagement and contempt of court.

Pluralistic reform efforts 
In 2011, Fazalur Rahim Marwat, the chairman of the textbook board of Khyber Pakhtunkhwa, stated that a reform of textbooks was being undertaken in the state. Marwat stated that previously, schoolbooks played a key role in spreading hatred against non-Muslims, particularly against Hindus, and distorted history. Such material had now been removed from the textbooks used in the state. Professor Marwat had previously blamed General Zia for "sowing seeds of discord in society on religious and ethnic lines by stuffing school curricula with material that promoted hatred now manifested in the shape of extremism, intolerance, militancy, sectarianism, dogmatism, and fanaticism". In addition, he stated, "After the Indo-Pakistani War of 1965, countless lessons and chapters were introduced that spread hatred among the students and portrayed India as the biggest enemy of the Muslims. That stuff should be done away with."

Sindh province has also made efforts to reform its curricula.

Single National Curriculum Controversy 
In August 2018, Prime Minister Imran Khan's Pakistan Tehreek-e-Insaf (PTI) dispensation came to power in Pakistan and in some state assemblies, with a revivalist promise of making a new Pakistan-like 'State of Medina' (Riyasat-e-Medina) which is modeled on governance adopted by Prophet Muhammad, and also promised a Single National Curriculum (SNC Urdu: Yuksaan Taleemi Nizam) to eliminate Pakistan's age-old class-based education system. The idea is to remold the education system in Pakistan to make sure that private, public schools, and madrasas follow a single unitary curriculum. The senate of Pakistan approved a law mandating compulsory teaching of the Arabic language in Federal-controlled schools. 

According to Huma Yusuf, SNC has caused controversy in a number of issues due to its narrowly defined religio-nationalist identity that poorly understands values of ethnolinguistic diversity and inclusion. Huma says, the narrowly defined religio-nationalist focus of the SNC that includes but is not limited to the conflation of secular and religious subjects, for example health-related life skills such as hygiene which is explained in a religious point of view rather than in a stand alone scientific manner; the constitutionality of federal fiat on  provincial subjects, the treatment of language of instruction and STEM topics, depiction of women, lack of essential life skills constitute, and some of other issues.

According to Farah Adeed, about Pakistan's electoral politics, it is claimed that the far-right does not get popular voter support vis-a-vis their propaganda is a half-truth, and that Pakistan’s case reveals that continued monopoly of ulema’ over  Pakistan's education helps them to create a popular cultural discourse to foster their narrative. Adeed says, If history would be the guide, there have been unremitting efforts to ‘forcibly’ Islamize the (Muslim) society, and make everyone a ‘good’ Muslim with results being counterproductive. The clerics refuse to learn from their past mistakes and understand the forceful imposition of Islam to the grassroots of social and political order ironically destabilizes the very foundations on which a stable society stands. Adeed says, in Pakistan's case leaders like Zulfikar Ali Bhutto or Imran Khan having a liberal outlook or past rather than being politically beneficial to liberalism, in their attempts to counter the Ulema by infusing a much more competitive extremist rhetoric in the name of Islam, potentially undermines not only the political discourse, but also the social fabric that ties the entire community.

The focus on religious studies in Pakistan's education began with the creation of Pakistan in 1947. Islamization of Pakistani education picked up pace in the 1970s under General Zia-ul-Haq's military regime. He brought in religious clerics to every segment of the education sector and patronized them to legitimize his political career. Zainab Akhter says that Imran Khan's educational policy is taking steps which even General Zia did not. Akhter says the new SNC policy fails to take into account the possibility of further radicalization of Pakistani private and public schools because of a curriculum heavily influenced by retrogressive ideological biases and distortions. Adeed says that educational experts are worried that the Prime Minister's policy, though aiming to bring national unity and cohesiveness in an apparently class-wise divided educational system, might end up achieving the opposite. According to Rubina Saigol, a Lahore-based educationist, the “madrassification” of public schools shall have serious ramifications. Saigol says the new curriculum is very likely to generate students with a conservative Islamic global outlook who would view women as subservient beings not deserving of freedom and independence.

As per the constitution of Pakistan, education is primarily a state (provincial) subject, so Sindh and Balochistan have not yet adopted a Single National Curriculum. Khyber Pakhtunkhua clergy have serious misgivings with the teaching of sciences through SNC. The government of Punjab began implementing SNC with a three-tier review mechanism. The first review would be conducted by a five-member External Review Committee. The second review to be performed by the clergy of the Muttahida Ulema Board. The third round of reviews to be conducted by the PCTB's own Internal Review Committee, for a  cost of Rs. 15,000 per NOC. Niaz says increased overheads and costs introduced under SNC, far from eradicating the class-based education system, are further leading to strengthening the class-based education system. Niaz further claimed that even science and mathematics books were subjected to evaluation by the Muttahida Ulema Board and their clergy directed publishers to remove the words ‘interest’ and ‘markup’ from the textbooks of mathematics. They also directed publishers not to depict any diagrams or sketches in the biology textbooks showing human figures “sans clothes”.

Meanwhile, the Federal Education Ministry clarified that media claims and criticism are speculative of religious inspection and correction of science books, since the subject of Biology is taught from grade 9 onwards and SNC is still to be implemented at senior school level. But Zenger News reporter, Furqan Mahmood, Manager of the Lahore-based publisher Urdu Bazar Depot, concurred with the claims of Fawaz Niaz; besides the provincial spokesperson announced that the Ulema Board would review the National Single Curriculum books under the provincial PCTB act, and warned publishers of action against those who would not get NOC from the PCTB, also claiming the MUB would review only religious material included in "any textbook". A PCTB spokesperson asked publishers to pay the book review fee and claimed the book review fee would not have any “considerable” effect on the textbook prices.

The Federal Education Ministry, while admitting that Islamic religious studies would remain mandatory to foster their religious learning across Pakistan, denied speculations that their ministry is asking schools to recruit any religious graduates from Madarsa's but said that schools would be free to choose and appoint religious teachers for the religious syllabus as per their own choice. An earlier one-man minority commission of Dr. Shoaib Suddle had recommended the omission of Islamic teachings and Islamic history write-ups from non-religious topic textbooks, but Tahir Ashrafi, Special Representative to the Prime Minister on Interfaith Harmony, demanded action against the minority commission for forwarding such suggestion. Ashrafi said that the educational curriculum approved by the Muttahida Ulema Board just gives a message of peace and tolerance and Islamic Shariah. Educationist Dr. AH Nayyar said that the new textbooks developed under the Single National Curriculum are failing in the development of critical thinking among students, and are also failing to understand the importance of inclusive education, and the policy implementers are adamant in enforcing religious instruction in textbooks with religiously neutral subjects despite the apex court's clear directions.

Dr. Ayesha Razzaque says that publishers also criticized the SNC in Punjab for not allowing l (public or private) schools to deliver above and beyond the SNC. Pakistan's Punjab province has explicitly disallowed the teaching of computer studies, art, music, handwriting, drama, etc. with the reasoning that it should not overburden children and that the SNC prepared by the government was already a well-balanced curriculum and was enough for children at the primary level. Razzaque says the new SNC also restricts the freedom of private schools to teach science to students from an early age. Pervez Hoodbhoy says the new SNC surpasses previous censorship of human evolution from academic studies and in Pakistan, the nation which consumes high levels of pornography and instances of Madrasah teachers engaging in child sexual abuse; scientific teaching of human biology through requisite educational images is being shunned with extended enforcement of religious modesty on the school curriculum. Hoodbhoy says extended claims of religious modesty are hampering medical facilitation to women since Islamist clergy is falsely claiming that men can derive pleasure even from ECG or ultrasound of female bodies. Discussion on breast, ovarian and cervical cancer, and child education against sexual abuse become difficult and over time the PTI SNC school curriculum, supervised by the clergy, will magnify body-related taboos. Hoodbhoy says that unsated curiosity and sexual repression caused by Pakistani clergy pose issues including high consumption of pornography among Pakistani youth. At the same time, government health departments are unable to discuss simple population control mechanisms. Educationist Yasmin Ashraf says she has 20 years of experience in primary education in Pakistan and she is concerned about the newly formed SNC curriculum in primary schools. Yasmin says the SNC's Islamic curriculum is massive, far larger than ever before. The syllabus has been extended from a few siparas to the entire Quran, accompanied by the rote memorisation of several surahs, ahadith, and numerous duas, in addition to Islamiat books. The new Islamiat curriculum is likely to put much  more strain on primary students than before. Yasmin says the inclusion of religious matter in every subject, including general knowledge, Urdu, and English, is a cause of concern. Rather than increasing knowledge of respective subject matters, the newly implemented SNC education policy treats other subjects as a supplementary of Islamist religious education and excessive focus on religious content can inadvertently inculcate a biased sense of self-righteousness among students and amounts to be ultra vires of the spirit of Article 22-1 of the Constitution of Pakistan.

Yasmin says all the content chapters in Urdu textbooks of every single educational year are written by one single author in one style and one agenda in a tedious and boring manner; this wipes out diversity and brings in monotony in the content that is neither likely to catch students' interest nor enrich them to their best. Yasmin says the general knowledge textbooks of grade 1 to 3 are  repetitive in nature, lacking in creativity, logic, fail to fulfill the curiosity of young children, fail to encourage critical thinking, and ignore the mandatory principle of textual hierarchy which expects that the introductory topic ought to serve as the foundation for the next more complex topic. Missing links or in-between pieces of information lead to students' confusion and is akin to climbing a ladder with missing rungs in order to reach the top of a tall building, hence making it difficult to serve as the foundation course for Science in Grade 4.

As per Dr. Ayesha Razzaque, the SNC along with passed laws and departmental guidelines, have effectively surrendered space to far-right religious clergy, in the name of the Muttahida Ulema Board in case of all the curriculum, the space which will be far difficult to reverse and reclaim. Correcting these wrongs has been left to the most vulnerable communities and civil society activists. The legal fights to correct them in times to come will be dangerous to life and are politically costly.

In  an anecdote claimed to be true by Dr. Ayesha Razzaque, in a science textbook picture, scientist Isaac Newton was depicted wearing a long garment and probably long hair or a wig, next to a tree, depicting the scientific legend relating to the moment wherein an apple fell from the tree which inspired him to discover the law of gravitation. One of the comments from the Punjab Curriculum and Textbook Board (Pakistan) PCTB's review of the book was that "the ‘lady’ in the picture be edited to add a scarf (hijab) on her head, so as to observe proper purdah."

As per Pervez Hoodbhoy, the Government of Pakistan ends up compromising on the standard of education in an effort to hybridize Private, Public, and Madrasah education in the name of the SNC and introducing rote learning of the Arabic language provides for no technical job skills.

Hoodbhoy says the objectives of Private, Public, and Madrasah education are supposed to be entirely different. Private and public education is supposed to prepare a student for earthly life whereas Madrasah education focuses on the afterlife with rote learning without scope for critical inquiry, hence both cannot be put together. Hoodbhoy says that lack of curiosity leaves Pakistanis and Muslims devoid of a scientific mindset; the traditional mindset considers knowledge to be a corpus of eternal verities to be acquired, stockpiled, disseminated, understood, and applied but not modified or transformed. Whereas the scientific mindset, on the other hand, includes ideas of forming, testing and, if necessary, abandoning hypotheses if they don't work. Comprehension, reasoning, and problem-solving, analytical reasoning, and creativity are important, not simple memorisation.

Hoodbhoy says that while Pakistan needs to invest in educational infrastructure, it is wasting money on the defense machinery. While Arab countries have money and a modern educational setup including that of hiring the best of western brains to teach there, they are still ending up as just being consumers of science and technology but fail to show progress since Arab culture has become self-absorbed and centred on self-congratulation. Hoodbhoy says Muslims are convinced that they possess  the only true religion and that Arabic is the most perfect language, it claims eternal monopoly over truth and that amounts to narcissism on a civilisational scale. Hoodbhoy says, in a new form of escapism, Pakistan is busy creating new narcissistic illusions seeking solace through hero-worshipping of  the fictionalised Ertugrul drama series and making up a Turkic-Islamic past for itself. Hoodbhoy says evidence for a further closing of the Pakistani mind is very much visible. In the Pakistani school curriculum, the study of world history, philosophy, epistemology, or comparative religions is altogether absent, and Hoodbhoy says PTI's Single National Curriculum, has massively increased religious content and rote learning. The new SNC policy is programming the brains of Pakistani children for a world other than the one they live in.

The practical implementation of a Single National Curriculum (SNC) has been publicized and made a part of the new syllabus of the Punjab School Education Department for Grade-1 to Grade-5. The Government has commenced SNC training for all Primary School Teachers to enhance teaching skills according to the new syllabus. The Punjab Government has given a mandate to the QAED (Quaid-e-Azam Academy for Educational Development) for organizing and managing the training of Public and Private teachers on SNC.

Lack of training in essential life skills 

According to Huma, Pakistan's young population deserves empowerment to keep themselves healthy and safe through essential life skills which the new SNC is lacking. The new SNC needs to be improved upon to include topics such as modules on human rights, equality, hygiene, and practical issues such as sexual health and consent from secondary level education onward.

Punjab Curriculum and Textbook Board controversies 
In 2020, the Punjab Curriculum and Textbook Board (PCTB) banned 100 textbooks, either considering some of them “unethical and illegal” and being “against” the two-nation theory and some other books as blasphemous and against religion.

Malala Yousafzai 
On 12 July 2021, the All Pakistan Private Schools Federation (APPSF), an apex body allegedly representing over 200,000 schools across Pakistan, celebrated 'I am not Malala Day' due to her views against the institution of marriage. On the same day, according to Imran Gabol, PCTB confiscated social studies textbooks of standard 7 published by Oxford University Press allegedly for printing the picture of Malala Yousufzai in the list of important personalities. The Human Rights Commission of Pakistan (HECP) took exception to the PCTB  action whereas the Federal Minister for Information and Broadcasting Chaudhry Fawad Hussain distanced his political party from the PCTB decision. The PCTB itself explained away the controversy saying the published books did not obtain their no objection certificate.

See also

 Bias in education
 Education in Pakistan
 NCERT controversy
 Pakistan Studies curriculum
 Japanese textbook controversy
 Sectarian violence in Pakistan

Bibliography
 MADRASA EDUCATION IN THE PAKISTANI CONTEXT:      CHALLENGES, REFORMS AND FUTURE DIRECTIONS ~ Zahid Shahab Ahmed 
 Nadia Agha,  Ghazal Shaikh. Teachers’ Perceptions of Gender Representation in Textbooks: Insights From Sindh, Pakistan. Journal of Education, Sage Journals. May 9, 2022.  https://doi.org/10.1177/00220574221097596

Further reading
 K.K. Aziz. (2004) The Murder of History : A Critique of History Textbooks used in Pakistan. Vanguard. 
 Nayyar, A. H. & Salim, Ahmad. (2003) The Subtle Subversion: The State of Curricula and Text-books in Pakistan – Urdu, English, Social Studies and Civics. Sustainable Development Policy Institute. The Subtle Subversion
 Pervez Hoodbhoy and A. H. Nayyar. Rewriting the history of Pakistan, in Islam, Politics and the state: The Pakistan Experience, Ed. Mohammad Asghar Khan, Zed Books, London, 1985.
 Pervez Hoodbhoy – What Are They Teaching in Pakistani Schools Today? (International Movement for a Just World) Pakistan-facts.com - pervez musharraf biography Resources and Information.This website is for sale!
Mubarak Ali. In the Shadow of history, Nigarshat, Lahore; History on Trial, Fiction House, Lahore, 1999; Tareekh Aur Nisabi Kutub, Fiction House, Lahore, 2003.
 A. H. Nayyar: Twisted truth: Press and politicians make gains from SDPI curriculum report. SDPI Research and News Bulletin Vol. 11, No. 1, January–February 2004
 Yvette Rosser: Islamization of Pakistani Social Studies Textbooks, RUPA, New Delhi, 2003.
 Yvette Rosser: Hegemony and Historiography: The Politics of Pedagogy. Asia Review, Dhaka, Fall 1999.
 
 Rubina Saigol. Knowledge and Identity – Articulation of Gender in Educational Discourse in Pakistan, ASR, Lahore 1995
 Tariq Rahman, Denizens of Alien Worlds: A Study of Education, Inequality and Polarization in Pakistan Karachi, Oxford University Press, 2004. Reprint. 2006
 Tariq Rahman, Language, Ideology and Power: Language learning among the Muslims of Pakistan and North India Karachi, Oxford UP, 2002.
 Tariq Rahman, Language and Politics in Pakistan Karachi: Oxford UP, 1996. Rept. several times. see 2006 edition.
 World Bank Case Study on Primary Education in Pakistan

References

Anti-Hindu sentiment
Anti-Indian sentiment
Discrimination in Pakistan
History of education in Pakistan
Pakistan studies
Policies of Pakistan
Propaganda in Pakistan
Textbook controversies
Education controversies in Pakistan
India–Pakistan relations